Mystic Prophecy is a power metal band from Bad Grönenbach, Germany. Their sound is described as hard and melodic, similar to American power metal bands such as Iced Earth, due to their melodic riffing and powerful drumming.

History
The band was formed in 2000 by Valley's Eve bandmates R.D. Liapakis and Martin Albrecht. Gus G was recommended to them by David T. Chastain and played all guitars on the three first albums, but left in 2005 in order to spend more time on his own band Firewind.
Since then the band had several changes in its line-up with singer R.D. Liapakis and guitarist Markus Pohl who has joined the band in 2005, being the only long-time members.

The band's latest line-up includes bass player Joey Roxx and drummer Hanno Kerstan. In August 2017 the band announced new guitar player Evan K.

Since 2001 the band has released 11 albums. Their 9th album War Brigade, released in 2016 with Massacre Records was up to that time the best selling album of the band, containing some of their best known songs like 'Metal Brigade', 'The Crucifix',  'Burning Out' and 'War Panzer'.

In January 2018 the band released Monuments Uncovered, an album containing metal covers of famous rock hits of the 70s and 80s like 'You keep me hanging on' (Kim Wilde/The Supremes), 'Shadow on the Wall' (Mike Oldfield), 'I'm Still Standing' (Elton John), 'Because The Night' (Patti Smith) etc.

In January 2020 Mystic Prophecy released its 11th album Metal Division. The album reached after few days of its release #20 in the German Charts 
  
and became a hit in the metal genre in iTunes Charts, in countries like Germany (#7), US (#23), Canada (#11), as well as an Amazon bestseller. 
The album release was accompanied with the singles and video clips Metal Division, Eye To Eye, Dracula and was followed by a tour.

Members

Timeline

Discography 

 Vengeance (2001)
 Regressus (2003)
 Never-Ending (2004)
 Savage Souls (2006)
 Satanic Curses (2007)
 Fireangel (2009)
 Ravenlord (2011)
 Killhammer (2013)
 War Brigade (2016)
 Monuments Uncovered (2018)
 Metal Division  (2020)

References

External links 
 Official homepage

German power metal musical groups
Musical quintets
Nuclear Blast artists